College of Bishops, also known as the Ordo of Bishops, is a term used in the Catholic Church to denote the collection of those bishops who are in communion with the Pope. Under Canon Law, a college is a collection (Latin collegium) of persons united together for a common object so as to form one body. The Bishop of Rome (the Pope) is the head of the college.

Authority of the college of bishops 
In Roman Catholic teaching, the college of bishops is the successor to the college of the apostles. While the individual members of the college of bishops are each directly responsible for pastoral care and governance in their own particular Church, the college as a whole has full supreme power over the entire Church:

The college exercises this supreme and full power in a solemn manner in an ecumenical council, but also through united action even when not gathered together in one place.

By present-day canon law it is for the Pope to select and promote the ways in which the bishops are to act collegially, such as in an ecumenical council, and it is for him to convoke, preside over (personally or by his delegates), transfer, suspend, or dissolve such a council, and approve its decrees. The Catholic Church teaches that the college of bishops, gathered in council or represented by the Pope, may teach some revealed truth as requiring to be held absolutely and definitively (infallibly).

Enunciation of the teaching by the Second Vatican Council 
The Second Vatican Council enunciated the doctrine of the collegiality of bishops as follows:

Unique relationship 
The relationship between the college of bishops and the individual bishops and in particular the Bishop of Rome has no secular counterpart, and its practical consequences cannot be deduced from secular models such as the various forms of governance of a state or of a corporation.

The doctrine of the collegiality of the bishops as a body was enunciated by the Second Vatican Council which "desired to integrate all the elements which make up the Church, both the mystical and the institutional, the primacy and the episcopate, the people of God and the hierarchy, striking new notes and establishing new balances which would have to be worked out and theologized upon in the lived experience of the Church."

See also
Collegiality in the Catholic Church
Episcopal Conference
Infallibility of the Church
Lumen gentium
Synod
Synod of Bishops (Catholic)
United Methodist Council of Bishops

References

External links
Catholic-Hierarchy

Episcopacy in the Catholic Church
Catholic ecclesiology
Ecclesiastical polity of the Catholic Church